Tselovalnikov is a Russian language surname derived from the occupation of tselovalnik.

The surname may refer to:

Igor Tselovalnikov (1944–1986), Soviet Olympic cyclist
Vladislav Tselovalnikov (born 1991),  Russian football goalkeeper

Russian-language surnames
Occupational surnames